Our Lady of Egypt is a Roman Catholic church in Kalina, Mumbai under the Archdiocese of Bombay. The church was founded in 1606 and celebrated its 400th anniversary in mid-2006. Father Rui Comelo is the parish priest .

References

Further reading
  Interview with Fr Milton Gonsalves about his book, Kole Kalyan or Kalina: The Origin Story. Gonsalves' first appointment as a priest was at the Church of Our Lady of Egypt in Kalina, in 1972, The church and parish are discussed.

External links
 Parish website

Roman Catholic churches in Mumbai
Roman Catholic churches in Maharashtra
1606 establishments in India
Religious organizations established in the 1600s